The 2019 Penrith Panthers season was the 53rd season in the club's history. Coached by Ivan Cleary and captained by James Tamou, the Panthers are competing in the National Rugby League's 2019 Telstra Premiership.

Squad

Player transfers
A † denotes that the transfer occurred during the 2019 season.

Fixtures

Pre-season

Regular season

Ladder

Other teams
In addition to competing in the National Rugby League, the Panthers are also fielding semi-professional teams in the 2019 Jersey Flegg Cup (for players aged under 20) and the New South Wales Rugby League's 2019 Canterbury Cup (NSW Cup).

Representative honours

Domestic

International

References 

Penrith Panthers seasons
Penrith Panthers season